Alexei Cherchnev (born 18 December 1979) is a Russian judoka.

Achievements

References

External links
 
 

1979 births
Living people
Russian male judoka